Volborattella is a genus of spiders in the family Oonopidae. It was first described in 2015 by Saucedo & Ubick. , it contains 5 species, all of Madagascar.

References

Oonopidae
Araneomorphae genera
Spiders of Madagascar